The Philippine House Special Committee on Creative Industry and Performing Arts is a special committee of the Philippine House of Representatives.

Members, 18th Congress

See also 
 House of Representatives of the Philippines
 List of Philippine House of Representatives committees

References

External links 
House of Representatives of the Philippines

Creative